Donald Stewart may refer to:
Donald Stewart (Scottish politician) (1920–1992), Scottish National Party politician
Sir Donald Stewart, 1st Baronet (1824–1900), British field marshal
Donald Ogden Stewart (1894–1980), American author and screenwriter
Donald E. Stewart (1930–1999), American screenwriter
Donald Stewart (Alabama politician) (born 1940), U.S. Senator from Alabama
Donald Morton Stewart (1923–1990), member of the Legislative Assembly of Northwest Territories
Donald Stewart (actor) (1910–1966), American actor
Donald Stewart (judge) (1928–2016), Australian judge and Royal Commissioner
Donald Stewart (Wisconsin politician) (1825–?), member of the Wisconsin State Assembly
Donald Franklin Stewart (1929–1996), museum director in Maryland
Donald Stewart (North Dakota politician), member of the North Dakota House of Representatives
Donald Stewart (tennis) (1859–1885), British tennis player
Donald Scott Stewart, American mechanical engineer
Donald William Stewart (1860–1905), British military officer
Donald Alexander Stewart, Scottish architect
H. Donald Stewart (born 1939), American politician in the New Jersey General Assembly
Donald Stewart, character from TV show Benidorm

Don Stewart may refer to:

Don Stewart (actor) (1935–2006), known for his long-running role on Guiding Light
Don Stewart (preacher) (born 1939), Pentecostal minister and faith healer
Don Stewart (rugby league) (born 1967), Western Samoan international
Don Stewart (Canadian politician) (born 1946), politician in Newfoundland, Canada
Don Stewart (Australian footballer) (1913–1979), Australian rules footballer
Don Stewart (Bonaire activist) (1925–2014), founder of Bonaire's scuba diving industry

See also
Stewart Donald (born 1970s), businessman and owner of Sunderland A.F.C.
Donald Stuart (disambiguation)